Bang Jae-min (born March 26, 1999), is a South Korean actor and rapper. He debuted as an actor on Top Management (2018). He also participated in the first two seasons of Mnet's rap competition show, High School Rapper.

Career

2017-2019: High School Rapper and acting debut 
Bang participated in the first season of Mnet's rap competition show, High School Rapper, in February 2017. He was eliminated at the regional competition round, but was brought back by the judges after barely surviving the revival match. He finished at the semi-final round, losing at 1:1 match.

In 2018, Bang participated once again on High School Rapper franchise in its second season. Eventually, he finished for the second time at the semi-final round.

On April 23, 2018, Amoeba Culture revealed that Bang had signed an exclusive contract with them since last year, having previously turned down offers from major agencies such as SM Entertainment and YG Entertainment. Two days later, Bang was confirmed to have his acting debut on Youtube Red's original series, Top Management. He also contributed to the series' OST by releasing "Me In (Feat. Chancellor)", which was a rearranged version of the song included in the EP of S.O.U.L, the series' fictional band.

On April 30, 2019, Bang terminated his exclusive contract with Amoeba Culture because of health reasons.

2021-present: Acting endeavors 
On February 21, 2021, after two years of hiatus, Bang released his debut EP Fairy Tale: Lingering with "Snow Man" as the lead single. The EP was started to be prepared by him from February 2020.

Bang signed an exclusive contract with PLVL Entertainment on December 17, 2021. He released the EP Shape: Alteration as his first work under the agency with "Dot" as the lead single on January 8, 2022.

Exactly a month later, on February 8, 2022, PLVL confirmed that Bang would appeared on TVING's Dear X Who Doesn't Love Me as Kim Do-bin, one of the main role's love interests. On October 19, PLVL announced that he would played as a high school student named Heo Jae-hoon on Genie TV's Summer Strike. He also participated in the drama's OST as a feature to tearliner's song "We Swim in Dreams", which released on December 6.

Discography

Extended plays

Filmography

Television series

Web series

Television shows

Music video appearances

References

External links 
 Bang Jae-min at PLVL
 
 

1999 births
Living people
21st-century South Korean male singers
South Korean male television actors
21st-century South Korean male actors
South Korean male web series actors